Pachira is a genus of tropical trees distributed in Central and South America, Africa and India. They are classified in the subfamily Bombacoideae of the family Malvaceae. Previously the genus was assigned to Bombacaceae.
 Prior to that the genus was found in the (now obsolete) Sterculiaceae.

Some 77 species have been identified.
They form small or large trees with digitate leaves, and the fruit an oval woody one-celled capsule opening by a number of divisions and containing many seeds. 
The genus name is derived from a language spoken in Guyana.

History 
Although first named Pachira by Jean Baptiste Aublet in 1775, Carl Linnaeus the Younger unaware of this separately is said to have called the genus Carolinea after Princess (or Marchioness) "Sophia Caroline of Baden" in 1782.
    

The principle of precedence gives the authority to Pachira.

The Margrave of Baden, Karl Wilhelm (1709 – 1738) founded the Karlsruhe Palace (Karlsruher Schloß) in 1715. He had a considerable interest in Botany, particularly the exotic, and had large numbers of trees imported for the Palace Gardens (Schloßgarten). He was succeeded by his Grandson, Karl Friedrich (1738 - 1811) who married Princess Karoline Luise von Hessen-Darmstadt (1723 - 1783) in 1751. Karoline Luise was a noted botanist. She corresponded with Carl von Linné (Linnaeus), cultivated numerous plants in the palace gardens, had engravings of them made for a book and had them all classified according to Linnaeus' system. Linnaeus' son, Carl Linnaeus the younger, recognised her contributions by naming one of the trees, Pachira aquatica (German: Glückskastanie) Carolinea princeps after her.

Commercial use 
Timber, cordage and seeds for stuffing pillows and cushions.

Selected species 

 Pachira aquatica Aubl. (syn. P. macrocarpa)
 Pachira emarginata A. Rich.
 Pachira fendleri Seem.
 Pachira glabra Pasq.
 Pachira insignis (Sw.) Savigny
 Pachira orinocensis (A.Robyns) W.S.Alverson
 Pachira quinata (Jacq.) W.S.Alverson

Formerly placed here 
 Pseudobombax grandiflorum (Cav.) A.Robyns (as P. cyathophora Casar.)

References

Further reading

 New Species and Combinations of Catostemma and Pachira (Bombacaceae) from the Venezuelan Guayana. William S. Alverson. Novon Vol. 4, No. 1 (Spring, 1994), pp. 3-8
 Don G. A general system of gardening and botany: containing a complete enumeration and description of all plants hitherto known with their generic and specific characters, places of growth, time of flowering, mode of culture and their uses in medicine and domestic economy : preceded by introductions to the linnaean and natural systems and a glossary of the terms used ; founded upon Miller's Gardener's dictionary and arranged according to the natural system ; in four volumes. London 1831. Carolinea I: 510

Bombacoideae
Malvaceae genera